Corentin Fiore (born 24 March 1995) is a Belgian professional footballer who plays for Belgian Division 2 club RAAL La Louvière. He plays as a left-back.

Club career 

Fiore is a youth exponent from Standard Liège. On 11 December 2014, he made his senior debut against Feyenoord Rotterdam in the UEFA Europa League. Standard manager Ivan Vukomanović gave him a place in his starting line-up.

On 9 January 2018 he signed with Palermo. After making only three appearances with the Rosanero (two at Serie B level during the final part of the 2017–18 season, plus one in a 2018–19 Coppa Italia game against Vicenza), he was loaned out to Serie C club Imolese for the remainder of the 2018–19 season.

After Palermo's exclusion from Serie B, he was signed as a free agent by Cercle Brugge.

On 16 January 2020 he returned to Italy, signing with Teramo. 

On 4 January 2021 he signed with Ravenna.

On 27 August 2021 he returned to Belgium and signed with fourth-tier Belgian Division 2 club RAAL La Louvière.

Career statistics

References

External links

1995 births
Living people
Belgian footballers
Association football defenders
Belgian people of Italian descent
Belgium under-21 international footballers
Belgium youth international footballers
Standard Liège players
Palermo F.C. players
Imolese Calcio 1919 players
Cercle Brugge K.S.V. players
S.S. Teramo Calcio players
Ravenna F.C. players
RAAL La Louvière players
Belgian Pro League players
Serie B players
Serie C players
Belgian expatriate footballers
Expatriate footballers in Italy
Belgian expatriate sportspeople in Italy